John G. Otten (August 21, 1870 – October 17, 1905) was a catcher for the St. Louis Browns of the National League in 1895.

Biography
Otten first played baseball in amateur leagues beginning in 1889 after growing up in Chicago. An injury in the catching position led manager Joe Quinn of the St. Louis Browns to get on the wire to bring Otten into the majors. However, his major league career would only last a few games due to an injury suffered on July 7 on a pitch taken to his thumb while attempting a bunt. It affected his ability to catch runners behind the plate and it would continue to hinder for the rest of his playing days. He dabbled in amateur baseball for the next couple of years until 1897. He worked as a book glider for the rest of his days in Chicago before dying of pneumonia in 1905. He is buried in Forest Home Cemetery in Illinois.

References

External links
 

1870 births
1905 deaths
19th-century baseball players
St. Louis Browns (NL) players
Newark Colts players
Scranton Miners players
San Antonio Missionaries players
Deaths from pneumonia in Illinois